Ignatius Wolfington (October 14, 1919 – September 30, 2004) was an American  actor. He was the youngest member of the prominent Wolfington family of Philadelphia, operators of a carriage business early in the 20th century and brother of the founder of Wolfington Body Company in Exton, Pennsylvania. He married Lynn Wood, an actress, in 1972.

Early life
Wolfington was born in Philadelphia, Pennsylvania.  He attended West Philadelphia Catholic High School, then studied at the Bessie V. Hicks School of Drama.

Wolfington served with distinction in the 102nd Infantry Division (United States) at the Battle of the Bulge during World War II. He received a battlefield commission as a first lieutenant. He was awarded the Silver Star for his role in saving thirty men. He also received the Purple Heart for wounds he received in battle. At his death he was buried with full military honors, at Arlington National Cemetery.

Career
A life member of The Actors Studio, Wolfington is best known for originating the role of Marcellus Washburn in the Broadway musical The Music Man, starring Robert Preston, which earned Wolfington a nomination for the 1958 Tony Award for Best Performance by a Featured Actor in a Musical. Buddy Hackett was cast in the role for the 1962 movie version. Wolfington appeared as Mayor Shinn in the short-lived 1980 Broadway revival of The Music Man, starring Dick Van Dyke.  He also played the role of Chef Ellsworth in "Mrs. McThing", a 1952 play which featured Helen Hayes.

Wolfington worked in the earliest days of live television, then later became a familiar face on TV appearing in several popular programs including Gunsmoke (“Mad Dog”, 1967), Get Smart, The Andy Griffith Show, The Waltons, The Mary Tyler Moore Show, Fantasy Island, and The Rockford Files. He made a few television movies, and also appeared in TV commercials. Wolfington appeared in several motion pictures including Penelope (1966), Hex (1973), Herbie Rides Again (1974), The Strongest Man in the World (1975), Telefon (1977) and  1941 (1979).

Labor union officer
For many years, Wolfington was a council member of the Actors' Equity Association, a New York City-based labor union for stage actors. In 1969, he saw the need for a West Coast office of the Actors' Fund of America to provide medical and financial assistance to actors beyond New York. Until that time, stage actors outside of New York had experienced difficulty securing adequate support from the headquarters there.  Wolfington handled over 10,000 cases in the fifteen years preceding his 2004 death in Studio City, California.

Filmography

Awards
Wolfington received the following awards:
Screen Actors Guild Life Achievement Award
Philip Loeb Humanitarian Award
Los Angeles Drama Critics Circle Award

References

External links

Obituary on the Actors Equity web site 

 

1919 births
2004 deaths
United States Army personnel of World War II
United States Army officers
Burials at Arlington National Cemetery
Recipients of the Silver Star
Screen Actors Guild Life Achievement Award
American male stage actors
American male film actors
American male television actors
Male actors from Philadelphia
20th-century American male actors